Charles Ware (9 March 1931 - November 2017) was an English former professional footballer who played as a winger in the Football League for York City, and in non-League football for Cliftonville and Scarborough.

References

1931 births
2017 deaths
Footballers from York
English footballers
Association football forwards
York City F.C. players
Scarborough F.C. players
English Football League players